Fertaric acid is a hydroxycinnamic acid found in wine and grapes. It is an ester formed from ferulic acid bound to tartaric acid.

It is a metabolite of caftaric acid after caftaric acid has been fed to rats. Fertaric acid is then found in plasma, kidney, and urine.

References 

O-methylated hydroxycinnamic acids
Hydroxycinnamic acid esters
Vinylogous carboxylic acids